Brooke Elliott (born November 16, 1974) is an American actress and singer. She has appeared in musical theatre, including the US tours of Beauty and the Beast and Wicked, and the Broadway productions of Taboo and The Pirate Queen. She is known for her roles as Jane Bingum on the Lifetime series Drop Dead Diva (2009–2014) and as Dana Sue Sullivan in the Netflix romantic drama Sweet Magnolias (2020–present).

Early life 
Elliott was born in Fridley, Minnesota, to Robert, a city manager, and Kathleen Elliott, on November 16, 1974. Elliott has one sister, Jamie Alexander, and one brother, Adam Elliott. Her parents have said that she began to sing when she was three years old, and footage exists of her at that age singing You Light Up My Life. Her family moved on several occasions, first to Blaine, Minnesota, and then out of state to Missouri, Oklahoma, and Illinois. The family settled in Riverview, Michigan, when Elliott was a junior in high school. She graduated from Gabriel Richard Catholic High School in 1993; she appeared in high school productions while there, including in Richard III and Joseph and the Amazing Technicolor Dreamcoat. Elliott went on to Western Michigan University, and graduated with a Bachelor of Fine Arts in Musical Theatre Performance in 1998.

Elliott worked as a temp and a waitress, including working at a 1950s-themed restaurant where she had to dance on the tables every hour.

Career 
For ten weeks in 1999, she was a member of Chicago-based stage combat theatre company Babes With Blades. As part of that role, she performed a scene from Robin Hood: Prince of Thieves, The Miracle Worker and Heathers. She left for her first professional theatre role as the Sugar Bowl in the US touring version of Beauty and the Beast. She also appeared as part of the cast in the North American tour of Wicked alongside Adam Lambert, whom she later supported when he appeared on American Idol.

She credits Rosie O'Donnell with getting her first Broadway role alongside Boy George in Taboo. Rosie later described her as "fresh off a Disney Cruise", but allowed her to come back for a second attempt. Elliott spent $117 to change her outfit and make-up in order to be better suited to the role; O'Donnell reimbursed Elliott when she was awarded a part in the show. The show closed after only a hundred performances, but O'Donnell subsequently praised Elliott's passion for the show. Elliott went on to play Majella in The Pirate Queen, which opened in Chicago in 2006 and moved to Broadway in 2007.

Her first film role was in the Mel Gibson film What Women Want in 2000. Her first television role was in an episode of Law & Order: Trial by Jury. In 2009, Elliott was cast as main character Jane Bingum on Lifetime's Drop Dead Diva. Producer Craig Zadan said of Elliott's casting, "We had to find somebody who's a beautiful leading lady, who can do the comedy and drama, and with Brooke, she nailed it". After the pilot, The New York Times described Elliott as "convincing, and even affecting, at every turn", and the Los Angeles Times said she was "a stage actress with fabulous comic timing and enormous dramatic flexibility". Elliott also sings on the soundtrack to the series. The show ended after its sixth season in 2014.

In 2016, Elliott starred opposite Katey Sagal in the CBS comedy pilot Upper Middle Bogan inspired by the Australian series. It was not ordered to series. In 2018, she went to star in the ABC comedy pilot created by Bobby Bowman about a dysfunctional family struggling with mental illness.

In 2019, Elliot was cast in a leading role on the Netflix romantic drama series Sweet Magnolias. In 2022, she executive produced and starred as a country music superstar in the Lifetime holiday movie A Country Christmas Harmony.

Personal life
During her time as the leading character in Drop Dead Diva, Elliott has discussed the perception of plus-size actresses on television, and describes her body type as normal sized, stating "The majority of women in America look like me. It's one of the things I love about the show."

Credits

Filmography

Discography

Cast recordings
Taboo – Original Broadway Cast (2003) – as Big Sue
The Pirate Queen – Original Broadway Cast (2007) – as Majella

Compilation albums
Drop Dead Diva – Music from the Original Television Series (2010)

Awards

References

External links 
 
 
 

1974 births
American television actresses
American film actresses
American musical theatre actresses
Living people
Actresses from Minnesota
Western Michigan University alumni
People from Fridley, Minnesota
21st-century American women